Neđeljko Konjokrad (born 1964) is a politician in Serbia. He served in the Assembly of Vojvodina from 2008 to 2020, originally with the Democratic Party (Demokratska stranka, DS) and subsequently with the Serbian Progressive Party (Srpska napredna stranka, SNS). He is now the president (i.e., speaker) of the municipal assembly of Alibunar.

Private career
Konjokrad is an entrepreneur. He lives in the community of Ilandža in Alibunar.

Politician

Assembly of Vojvodina
Konjokrad was elected to the provincial assembly for the Alibunar constituency seat as a DS candidate in the 2008 and 2012 provincial elections, in each instance in the second round of voting. The DS and its allies won both elections, and Konjokrad was a government supporter while he was a member of the party. On 2 June 2014, he left the DS to join the SNS.

Vojvodina switched to a system of full proportional representation prior to the 2016 provincial election. Konjokrad appeared on the forty-fourth position on the Progressive Party's Aleksandar Vučić – Serbia Is Winning electoral list and was re-elected when the list won a majority victory with sixty-three out of 120 mandates. He again served as a government supporter for the next four years and did not seek re-election at the provincial level in 2020.

Municipal politics
Konjokrad has also served in the Alibunar municipal assembly. He received the fifth position on the Progressive Party's list for the 2016 local election in Alibunar and was elected when the list won a narrow majority victory with twelve out of twenty-three mandates. He was chosen as president of the assembly on 13 July 2018.

He was given the fifteenth position on the Progressive list in the 2020 local election and was narrowly re-elected when the list won sixteen mandates. After the election, he was appointed to another term as assembly president.

Electoral record

Provincial (Vojvodina)

References

1964 births
Living people
People from Alibunar
Members of the Assembly of Vojvodina
Democratic Party (Serbia) politicians
Serbian Progressive Party politicians